Tyler Nelson is a film and television editor who has edited the feature films The Batman (2022) and Creed III (2023) and the TV series Mindhunter (2017-2019). Nelson has worked for director David Fincher both as an assistant editor and as an editor.

For The Batman, Nelson and William Hoy were nominated for a Saturn Award for Best Editing.

Credits

References

External links

American film editors
American television editors
Living people